Orgreave is a hamlet and former civil parish, now in the parish of Alrewas, in the Lichfield district, in the county of Staffordshire, England. In 1881 the parish had a population of 113.

From 1866 Orgreave was a civil parish in its own right, on 25 March 1884 the parish was abolished and merged with Alrewas, on 1 February 1996 that "Alrewas" was renamed "Alrewas and Fradley". On 1 April 2009 it became part of the new "Alrewas" parish.

Orgreave Hall, formerly a seat of the Viscounts Anson, is a private home.

See also
Listed buildings in Alrewas

References

External links 

Hamlets in Staffordshire
Former civil parishes in Staffordshire
Lichfield District